Thomas Kelly (1830 – 20 September 1921) was a 19th-century Member of Parliament in Taranaki, New Zealand.

He then became a member of the Legislative Council from 1892 to 1913.

In 1893 Kelly, a new councillor was at the centre of a drama that led to the passing of the Women's suffrage bill into law. Premier Seddon had expected to stop the bill in the upper house, but found that one more vote was needed. Kelly had left himself paired in favour of the measure, but Seddon obtained his consent by wire to change his vote. Seddon's manipulation so incensed two opposition councillors William Reynolds and Edward Cephas John Stevens that they changed sides and voted for the bill, allowing it to pass by 20 votes to 18 and so gave the vote to women.

Kelly died at his home in Bell Block on 20 September 1921, and was buried at Te Henui Cemetery.

References

1830 births
1921 deaths
Members of the New Zealand House of Representatives
Members of the New Zealand Legislative Council
People from New Plymouth
New Zealand Liberal Party MLCs
Unsuccessful candidates in the 1884 New Zealand general election
Unsuccessful candidates in the 1887 New Zealand general election
New Zealand MPs for North Island electorates
Burials at Te Henui Cemetery
19th-century New Zealand politicians